Nikolaos "Nikos" Barlos (alternate spelling: Mparlos) (born July 12, 1979) is a Greek retired professional basketball player and coach. During his playing career, at a height of 2.03 m (6'8") tall, he played at both the small forward and power forward positions.

Professional playing career
Barlos won the Greek 2nd Division championship with Apollon Patras in 2003. He was named the MVP of the 2005 Greek All-Star Game. In the next season, he moved to Olympiacos, and with them he played in the EuroLeague. In 2015, he signed with Lavrio.

On November 12, 2017, Barlos joined Kymis of the top-tier level Greek Basket League.

National team playing career
Barlos was a member of Greece's under-26 national selection that won the silver medal at the 2005 Mediterranean Games.

Coaching career
After he retired from playing professional basketball, Barlos began his basketball coaching career in 2018, as he became a head coach of the Olympiacos youth academies. In 2019, he became the assistant coach of the reserve team of Olympiacos, Olympiacos B, of the Greek 2nd Division.

Awards and accomplishments

Playing career
2× Greek 2nd Division Champion: (2003, 2017)
2× Greek League All-Star: (2005, 2011)
Greek All-Star Game MVP: (2005)

References

External links
Euroleague.net Profile
FIBA Europe Profile
Eurobasket.com Profile
Greek Basket League Profile 
Hellenic Basketball Federation Profile 

1979 births
Living people
AEK B.C. players
Apollon Patras B.C. players
Aris B.C. players
Competitors at the 2005 Mediterranean Games
Greek basketball coaches
Greek men's basketball players
Kymis B.C. players
Lavrio B.C. players
Mediterranean Games medalists in basketball
Mediterranean Games silver medalists for Greece
Nea Kifissia B.C. players
Olympiacos B.C. players
Panionios B.C. players
Basketball players from Patras
Power forwards (basketball)
Small forwards